Demonstrations in Chaos is a 2002 archives release by progressive metal band Watchtower, containing various early recordings that span the years 1983 to 1987.

The first 7 songs on the album were recorded in the summer of 1983 for the intended original version of Energetic Disassembly; it was scrapped when B.O.S.S. (short for Bob O'Neill Sound Studios) and its label, Rainforest Records, went under. All 7 tracks, plus "Violent Change", were re-cut for the 1985 Zombo Records release.

Track listing
 "Meltdown" - 4:03
 "Asylum" - 4:00
 "Argonne Forest" - 4:52
 "Social Fears" - 4:43
 "Tyrants in Distress" - 6:00
 "Energetic Disassembly" - 5:21
 "Cimmerian Shadows" - 6:44
 "The Eldritch" (demo version) - 3:10
 "Instruments of Random Murder" (demo version) - 3:50
 "Hidden Instincts" (demo version) - 4:43
 "The Fall of Reason" (demo version) - 6:55
 "Control and Resistance" - 7:02
 "Cathode Ray Window" - 6:06
 "Ballad Assassin" (live) - 4:12
 "Meltdown" ('Cottage Cheese From the Lips of Death' version) - 3:58

All songs composed by Doug Keyser; except 10. "Hidden Instincts", which is composed by Ron Jarzombek and Doug Keyser, and 14. "Ballad Assassin", which is composed by Watchtower.

Band line-up
 Jason McMaster - vocals
 Billy White - guitars (tracks 1-7; 12-15)
 Ron Jarzombek - guitars (tracks 8-11)
 Doug Keyser - bass
 Rick Colaluca - drums

References

External links
 Blabbermouth review
 Lords of Metal review
 KNAC.com review
 DIC @ CD Baby
 DIC @ Rockadrome
 DIC @ Amazon.com

Watchtower (band) albums
2002 compilation albums